Panagi is a surname. Notable people with the surname include:

Antonis Panagi (born 1983), Cypriot footballer
Constantinos Panagi (born 1994), Cypriot footballer
Giorgos Panagi (born 1986), Cypriot footballer 
Nektaria Panagi (born 1990), Cypriot long jumper

Greek-language surnames
Surnames of Greek origin